Bloom Creek may refer to:

Bloom Creek (Madden Creek tributary), a stream in Missouri
Bloom Creek (South Dakota), a stream in South Dakota